Nelli Alexeyevna Chervotkina, later surname Pylkina is a former pair skater for the Soviet Union. With Viktor Teslia, she is the 1979 Prague Skate champion, 1982 Skate America bronze medalist, and 1983 Winter Universiade champion. Their coaches were Ludmila Velikova and Aleksandr Vlasov.

Pylkina coaches skating in Sweden. She was based in Lidköping and Linköping before moving to the Stockholm region.

In August 1990, she gave birth in Saint Petersburg to her daughter Angelika Pylkina, who would become a pair skater for Sweden.

Competitive highlights 
With Teslia

References 

1965 births
Figure skating coaches
Soviet female pair skaters
Living people
Russian emigrants to Sweden
Figure skaters from Saint Petersburg
Universiade medalists in figure skating
Universiade gold medalists for the Soviet Union
Competitors at the 1983 Winter Universiade